Nucleorhabdovirus was a genus of viruses in the family Rhabdoviridae. In 2019, the genus was split into the following three genera, all of which still contain the name nucleorhabdovirus and which are assigned to the same family:

 Alphanucleorhabdovirus
 Betanucleorhabdovirus
 Gammanucleorhabdovirus

In 2020, the three genera were organized into subfamily Betarhabdovirinae.

References

Obsolete virus taxa